"The Burning Man" is the second segment of the eighth episode from the first season (1985–86) of the television series The Twilight Zone. It is based on Ray Bradbury's short story "The Burning Man", first published in his collection Long After Midnight (1976). A very direct adaption which recreates much of the dialogue word-for-word, it deals with a boy and his aunt who, while driving on an isolated country road, encounter a crazed hitchhiker who claims to be an evil creature with a life cycle similar to a periodical cicada.

Plot
On a hot summer day in 1936 Kansas, a boy and his aunt Neva are driving along a country road. They pick up an old man in raggedy clothes who hails them to stop. Once aboard, the old man unnerves them by suggesting that the heat has driven him to madness. Using the device of theorizing, he tells them about a genetically evil man who, rather than being born, was revived by the day's intense heat after 57 years of sleeping in the river bed. Then, when night falls, the 57-year man molts off his old body and emerges as a newborn child, and then, voraciously hungry and thirsty after 57 years of sleep, proceeds to consume the surrounding landscape, wildlife, and people. When the old man begins describing the man eating people with an enthusiasm that suggests he himself is the 57-year man, Neva stops the car and throws him out. She and the boy laugh it off and head for a lake, where they stop and enjoy the day.

On the drive home, night falls, and the boy begins to worry about running into the old man again. They come upon a boy in a bright white suit. He claims he was at a picnic and got lost. They pick him up. The boy in the white suit leans forward and says something to Neva which makes her realize the boy is the old man they picked up before. The car comes to a stop and the boy in the white suit, smiling, leans forward and asks "Have you ever wondered if there was such a thing as genetic evil in the world?".

From a long shot, the headlights of the car go dark.

Production
This segment was written and directed by J. D. Feigelson, who counted Ray Bradbury, writer of the original short story, as a writing mentor of his. Feigelson wrote the teleplay for a proposed anthology series called Strange Dimensions, though he said little was involved in writing the adaptation beyond cutting unnecessary dialogue from the short story and putting it into teleplay form. He did make the minor addition of the tire blowout, simply to add more variety to the shots. All the changes were reviewed by Bradbury for his approval. After Strange Dimensions failed to get picked up, the script was repurposed for The Twilight Zone. Feigelson was reluctant to direct the segment, having never directed a Hollywood production before, but Bradbury insisted that Feigelson be the director since he was afraid that anyone else might take liberties with the story.

Like the setting of the story, filming took place on an extremely hot day, and precautions had to be taken to keep the actors and crew from suffering sunburn or heat stroke. The car was not driven but towed along by a truck with a trailer so that there would be a place to mount the camera.

References

External links
 

The Twilight Zone (1985 TV series season 1) episodes
1985 American television episodes
Fiction set in 1936
Television episodes set in Kansas

fr:Le Mal génétique